Princess Mauritia Eleonora of Portugal (1609 – 15 June 1674), was a princess from the House of Aviz. As a close relative of Prince Frederick Henry of Orange, she spent a long time at his court in The Hague. Later in life she married a count from the House of Nassau-Siegen.

Biography
Mauritia Eleonora was the fifth daughter and the ninth of ten children of Prince Manuel of Portugal (1568–1638) and Countess Emilia of Nassau (1569–1629). Where and when Mauritia Eleonora was born is unknown. She was baptised in Delft on 10 May 1609. Out of gratitude for the reconciliation between her mother and her uncle Prince Maurice of Orange, Mauritia Eleonora was named after her uncle. Mauritia Eleonora’s father was the son of the Portuguese prior and self-proclaimed Portuguese king António of Portugal, her mother was the youngest daughter of Prince William I ‘the Silent’ of Orange and Duchess Anna of Saxony.

Mauritia Eleonora first lived with her parents at the Prinsenhof in Delft and then, from 1618 to 1626, at no. 3 Lange Vijverberg in The Hague, opposite the Stadholder’s Quarter. After her parents’ divorce in 1626 she settled with her mother and sisters in Geneva, where her mother died in 1629. She then returned to the Dutch Republic and took up residence at the court of her uncle Frederick Henry. There she shared a room with Countess Louise Christine of Solms-Braunfels, the youngest sister of her aunt Amalia of Solms-Braunfels.

As Mauritia Eleonora was in daily contact at court with her first cousin Countess Louise Henriette of Nassau, eldest daughter of Prince Frederick Henry, it was important for her second cousin Count William Frederick of Nassau-Diez, stadholder of Friesland, who wanted to marry Louise Henriette, to maintain good contacts with Mauritia Eleonora. She told William Frederick in November 1644 what he already feared, namely that Louise Henriette had a secret correspondence with Henri Charles de la Trémoïlle Prince of Talmont, who also wanted to marry her. William Frederick did not immediately realise Mauritia Eleonora’s motives for providing him with information, nor how biased that information was. He was rather charmed by her. Mauritia Eleonora declared that she had a more sincere friendship with no one than with him. William Frederick asked her if she could ‘wel oover zee soude kunnen gaen’, that is, if she would marry him, to which she replied: ‘jae, dat se mit niemants anders liver soude willen gaen’ (‘yes, that she would prefer to go with no one else’) and said that she had never valued or trusted anyone as much as him, and ‘daer se soo vrie mit had geweest, en woud liever mit mij dreuch broodt eeten als mit een ander goede daghen hebben’ (‘since she had been so free with me, and would rather eat dry bread with me than have good days with someone else’). William Frederick assured her that whoever married her would be the happiest man on earth, and that the only thing preventing him from attaining that status was his promise to his mother to marry Louise Henriette or Albertine Agnes of Nassau, Louise Henriette’s younger sister. There was talk of Mauritia Eleonora being coupled with another second cousin, Count John Maurice of Nassau-Siegen, but she would have none of it.

In May 1645, the relationship between William Frederick and Mauritia Eleonora had become strained; she had realised that she would not succeed in dissuading him from his intentions. In the same month Louise Henriette had quarreled with Mauritia Eleonora, who had gossiped about her. She had claimed that Louise Henriette looked too much at a certain man. Louise Henriette was alarmed (her parents did not know anything about her romance with the Prince of Talmont) and William Frederick noticed that since that clash, during the meals Louise Henriette only glanced at the place where the men were sitting in a cursory and guilty manner.

In the spring of 1646, there were scenes at court. Amalia of Solms-Braunfels, who wanted Louise Henriette to marry Charles, Prince of Wales or Elector Frederick William of Brandenburg, had noticed to her annoyance that her plans threatened to be thwarted by her daughter’s close relationship with the Prince of Talmont, and she had expressed her displeasure. Louise Henriette had then expressed her distaste for the candidates desired by her mother. While the negotiations for a marriage with the Prince of Wales were at an advanced stage, Louise Henriette had said that she would refuse to marry him. The conflict had not really come to a head, for the position of the Stuarts had become so precarious in England that the negotiations had been broken off. But that only cleared the way for the second candidate, Frederick William of Brandenburg. Amalia was very much in favour of her daughter marrying the Elector, but Louise Henriette did not want to marry him either. Amalia did not trust her daughter and was afraid that Louise Henriette would try to force a marriage with the Prince of Talmont. Amalia therefore had her daughter watched for some time by Mauritia Eleonora, who did her job very thoroughly. The Prince of Talmont complained that he really could not be alone for a moment with Louise Henriette. He attributed Mauritia Eleonora’s slavishness to her dependent position at court: she was an orphan, already in her mid-thirties and had no assets. If she still wanted to marry, she would need the help of her aunt Amalia.

In September 1646, Mauritia Eleonora betrayed the secret correspondence between Louise Henriette and the Prince of Talmont and received Amalia’s permission or maybe even the order to get her hands on the letters. This was possible because Louise Henriette, despite her lover’s warnings, did not burn the letters but kept them in a locked box in her cabinetry, that was also locked. After Mauritia Eleonora one day had discovered two letters, she brutally had the locks opened by a blacksmith when Louise Henriette was not there, and then gave the letters to Amalia. Thereupon the Prince of Talmont fell out of favour with Frederick Henry and Amalia. Louise Henriette married Frederick William of Brandenburg in the same year.

Thereafter, Mauritia Eleonora wanted to leave the court at all costs and she was determined to marry quickly, if necessary to a man with no money. Frederick Henry would be morally obliged to provide her husband with a good office. Her second cousin Count George Frederick of Nassau-Siegen appeared to her to be a suitable candidate. But Amalia preferred to couple her with her nephew Frederick of Dohna, the eldest son of her sister Ursula. In the end, Mauritia Eleonora married George Frederick.

Mauritia Eleonora, now 38 years old, married in The Hague on 4 June 1647 to her second cousin Count George Frederick of Nassau-Siegen (Dillenburg Castle, 23 February 1606 – Bergen op Zoom, 2 October 1674), the second son of Count John VII ‘the Middle’ of Nassau-Siegen and his second wife, Duchess Margaret of Schleswig-Holstein-Sonderburg. George Frederick served in the Dutch States Army and became captain of the infantry in 1627, and in 1633 also ritmeester of the cavalry. In 1637 he was promoted to major and in 1642 to colonel. In the struggle for the county of Nassau-Siegen, John Maurice, the eldest brother of George Frederick, had, after his return from Dutch Brazil, with his brothers George Frederick and Henry and an 80-man entourage, forcibly occupied  on 22 January 1645, and had received the renewed homage from the citizens on 15 February, albeit this time only for two thirds of the county. In order to end the constant dispute, John Maurice wanted to adhere strictly to his father’s will and testament of 1621 and leave his nephew John Francis Desideratus the one third that was due to him. Already before his departure to Brazil he had explicitly authorised his subjects on 25 October 1635 to recognise his then still living halfbrother John VIII ‘the Younger’ as co-ruler. In 1645 John Maurice relinquished his rights to the Freudenberg district, granted by the will of 1621, in favour of his brother George Frederick. George Frederick ceded all his rights to John Maurice in 1649. In 1648 George Frederick became commander of Rheinberg, and in 1658 he became governor of Bergen op Zoom. On 6 May 1664 he was elevated into the Reichsfürstenstand.

Mauritia Eleonora died in Bergen op Zoom on 15 June 1674, where she was buried one day later. George Frederick died on 2 October 1674, also in Bergen op Zoom. The marriage of Mauritia Eleonora and George Frederick remained childless.

Ancestors

Notes

References

Sources
 
  (1999). "Brederodes Haags huwelijksfeest – Voornaam vertoon". In:  e.a. (red.), Johan Wolfert van Brederode 1599-1655. Een Hollands edelman tussen Nassau en Oranje (in Dutch). Vianen: Historische Vereniging Het Land van Brederode/Zutphen: Uitgeversmaatschappij Walburg Pers. p. 47–56. .
 
  (1911). "George Frederik, Georg Friedrich". In:  en  (redactie), Nieuw Nederlandsch Biografisch Woordenboek (in Dutch). Vol. Eerste deel. Leiden: A.W. Sijthoff. p. 926.
 
 
 
 
 
 
 
 ;  (1999). "Johan Wolfert van Brederode 1599–1655 – ʻIn Opbloey neergetoghenʼ". In:  e.a. (red.), Johan Wolfert van Brederode 1599–1655. Een Hollands edelman tussen Nassau en Oranje (in Dutch). Vianen: Historische Vereniging Het Land van Brederode/Zutphen: Uitgeversmaatschappij Walburg Pers. p. 9–46. .
 
 
 
 
 
 
 
  (2004). "Die Fürstengruft zu Siegen und die darin von 1669 bis 1781 erfolgten Beisetzungen". In:  u.a. (Redaktion), Siegener Beiträge. Jahrbuch für regionale Geschichte (in German). Vol. 9. Siegen: Geschichtswerkstatt Siegen – Arbeitskreis für Regionalgeschichte e.V. p. 183–202.
  (1920), "Louise Henriette van Oranje. Keurvorstin van Brandenburg 1628-1667". In: , Prinsessen van Oranje in Duitschland (in Dutch). Haarlem: H.D. Tjeenk Willink & Zoon. p. 66–108.
 
  (1979). "Genealogische gegevens". In:  (red.), Nassau en Oranje in de Nederlandse geschiedenis (in Dutch). Alphen aan den Rijn: A.W. Sijthoff. p. 40–44, 81–82. .
 
  (1882). Het vorstenhuis Oranje-Nassau. Van de vroegste tijden tot heden (in Dutch). Leiden: A.W. Sijthoff/Utrecht: J.L. Beijers.

External links

 Capet, Part 9. In: An Online Gotha, by Paul Theroff.
 Nassau. In: Medieval Lands. A prosopography of medieval European noble and royal families, compiled by Charles Cawley.
 Nassau Part 5. In: An Online Gotha, by Paul Theroff.
 Portret van Eleonora Mauritia van Portugal (in Dutch). In: Royal Dutch Collections.
 Portugal, Kings. In: Medieval Lands. A prosopography of medieval European noble and royal families, compiled by Charles Cawley.

Portugal, Mauritia Eleonora
Portugal, Mauritia Eleonora
House of Aviz
∞
Portugal, Mauritia Eleonora
Portugal, Mauritia Eleonora
Portugal, Mauritia Eleonora